The 1996–97 season was Paris Saint-Germain's 27th season in existence. PSG played their home league games at the Parc des Princes in Paris, registering an average attendance of 35,302 spectators per match. The club was presided by Michel Denisot and the team was coached by Ricardo. Raí was the team captain.

Players

First-team squad

Kits 

German automobile manufacturer Opel was the shirt sponsor. American sportswear brand Nike was the kit manufacturer.

Pre-season and friendlies

Competitions

Overall record

Division 1

League table

Monaco 0 points
PSG 100 points

Results summary

Results by round

Matches

Coupe de France

Coupe de la Ligue

UEFA Cup Winners' Cup

Second round

Second round

Quarter-finals

Semi-finals

Final

UEFA Super Cup

References

External links 

Official websites
 PSG.FR - Site officiel du Paris Saint-Germain
 Paris Saint-Germain - Ligue 1 
 Paris Saint-Germain - UEFA.com

Paris Saint-Germain F.C. seasons
Paris Saint-Germain